Carpenter's Bar, Montana was an early unincorporated community in Powell County, site of a post office from June–December 1872, with Thomas Pounds as postmaster.  It was the site of a gold mine discovered on June 3, 1865.

References

Unincorporated communities in Powell County, Montana
Unincorporated communities in Montana